In Lebanon, there is only one women's football league: the Lebanese Women's Football League. Thus, there are no promotions or relegation to date.

Lebanese Women's Football League

Current 
The following clubs are in the Lebanese Women's Football League for the 2021–22 season:

 BFA
 EFP
 ÓBerytus
 Safa
 SAS
 Super Girls
 Taadod Mazraat Chouf
 United Tripoli

Former 
The following clubs used to play in the Lebanese Women's Football League at one point:

 Adab & Riyada (2008)
 Ansar (2007–2010)
 Arabi Tripoli (2011–2013)
 Athletico (2010–2013)
 Akhaa Ahli Aley (2015–2020)
 FC Beirut (2011–2017)
 GFA (2011–2017)
 Helium (2019–2020)
 Homenmen (2008–2009)
 Hoops (2018–2020)
 Jabal Al-Shaykh (2017–2019)
 Kfarchima (2009–2020)
 Montada North Lebanon (2019–2021)
 Nejmeh (2016–2017)
 Primo (2019–2021)
 Sadaka (2008–2013)
 Sakafi Chhim (2018–2021)
 Salam Zgharta (2015–2020)
 Shabab Arabi (2008–2012)
 Shabab Tripoli (2008–2012)
 Shooters (2011–2013)
 Southern Stars (2018–2020)
 Sporting High (2017–2019)
 Zouk Mosbeh (2017–2019)

See also 
 List of football clubs in Lebanon
 Women's football in Lebanon
 List of women's football teams
 List of women's national football teams
 International competitions in women's association football

References 

 
Lebanon women
Women's